Hydrillodes uliginosalis is a species of litter moth of the  family Erebidae. It is found throughout many countries of subtropical Africa (including islands of the Indian Ocean).

This species has strong sexual dimorphism: the females are brown/clear brown, the males are very dark coloured, almost black.

The length of the forewings is 13–14 mm.

References

External links
drlegrain.be: pictures of Hydrillodes uliginosalis
boldsystems.org: Picture of Hydrillodes uliginosalis

Moths described in 1854
Herminiinae
Moths of Madagascar
Lepidoptera of Mozambique
Moths of Réunion
Moths of Sub-Saharan Africa